Canvas Stadium, officially Sonny Lubick Field at Canvas Stadium, is an outdoor college football stadium in the western United States, located on the campus of Colorado State University (CSU) in Fort Collins, Colorado.

The home field of the CSU Rams of the Mountain West Conference, it opened  on August 5, 2017, and hosted its first game three weeks later. It replaced Sonny Lubick Field at Hughes Stadium, which had been the Rams' home since 1968. Canvas Stadium has a seating capacity of 36,500, but can hold as many as 41,000.

Development 
After a nearly two-year process including cost and financing changes, protests, community outreach, and an inter-governmental agreement with the city of Fort Collins, the $220 million, 41,000-capacity on-campus multi-purpose stadium began construction in May 2015.

In 2013, the university began raising funds for a ~40,000-seat on-campus facility to replace Hughes Stadium. The project was partially driven by major decreases in state funding for CSU in recent decades. As a result, CSU has been seeking to draw more out-of-state students, whose current tuition is three times that of Colorado residents. CSU president Anthony A. Frank included the new stadium as part of this goal saying "the new facility will help build a winning football team while advancing one of the school's highest priorities: attracting more out-of-state students".

According to The Wall Street Journal, "Skeptics, including some alumni and faculty, see the project as a boondoggle—especially for a team that plays in a relatively low-profile athletic conference and doesn't sell out its current 32,500-seat stadium off campus. The debate has sparked dueling websites, animated letters to the editor and arguments about the role of sports at a university."   Many community members expressed frustration that they did not feel they were being heard at the CSU Board of Governors meeting when final approval was given. After the vote Board chair, Dorothy Horrell, thanked those making comments for their input and reiterated her feeling that   "the decision to build an on-campus stadium was made after "thoughtful and thorough examination of this issue" that is reflected in the board's records.  "As my parents used to tell me, just because I ask a question and didn't get the answer I wanted, it isn't that the question wasn't answered," Horrell said. "And I would just remind us all of that."

The new stadium, initially estimated to cost $246 million, was originally only to be built if $125 million in private funds had been raised by October 2014. Plans were put on hold after fundraising support for the project failed to materialize as expected, according to a September 26, 2014, story in the Denver Business Journal. On November 29, 2014, Frank sent a memo to the school's board of governors recommending that the new stadium be approved without raising the 50% cost in public funds as previously planned. The memo estimated that a 35,900-seat facility would cost $195 million; building with a capacity of 41,200 would cost $220 million.  Frank also estimated that renovating Hughes Stadium to last 30 to 40 years would cost a minimum of $149 million.

The board of governors approved a new on campus multi-purpose stadium on December 5, 2014. At that time, NBCSports.com writer Brent Sobleski speculated that the hiring of Rams head coach Jim McElwain for the head coaching vacancy at Florida days earlier may have swayed the board, noting, "An improving program and a new stadium could help lure another top-level candidate like the school previously did when McElwain was initially hired."
CSU went on to hire Mike Bobo from the SEC like McElwain before him.  University of Georgia's Coach Bobo was named the nation's Offensive Coordinator of the Year in 2013 by 247Sports.com.  Georgia also had the top scoring offense in the SEC in 2014, Bobo's last season before heading to CSU.

Construction of the new stadium, tentatively known as Colorado State Stadium, began in May 2015; the official groundbreaking ceremony was held the weekend of CSU's September 12, 2015 home football game against Minnesota. The first game in the new stadium was August 26, 2017, when the Rams defeated Oregon State 58–27.

Stadium donations 
In March 2016, the university announced that it had received an anonymous gift of $20 million over a 30-year period with the express purpose of naming the playing field at the new stadium after former Rams head coach Sonny Lubick, whose name was also attached to the playing field at Hughes Stadium. This gift was roughly the amount that the university had hoped to make by selling the naming rights to both the stadium and the field.

In August of that year, New Belgium Brewing Company, an iconic, local Fort Collins brewery, donated $4.3 million to put its name and its product on the party deck of the north end zone of the $220 million stadium. This new bar area is called the New Belgium Porch.

On April 19, 2018, CSU announced it had sold the naming rights of the stadium itself to Public Service Credit Union for $37.7 million over 15 years. The actual name was not revealed at that time because PSCU was in the process of adopting a new name, which was ultimately revealed on June 5 of that year as Canvas Credit Union. Accordingly, the stadium became Canvas Stadium.

Attendance records

Canvas Stadium has a seating capacity of 36,500, but can hold as many as 41,000.

See also
 List of NCAA Division I FBS football stadiums

References

External links

 

College football venues
Colorado State Rams football
Buildings and structures in Larimer County, Colorado
Tourist attractions in Larimer County, Colorado
American football venues in Colorado
Sports venues completed in 2017
2017 establishments in Colorado
Soccer venues in Colorado